Pickwick Dam (also known as Pickwick Village) is an unincorporated community in Hardin County, Tennessee, United States. Pickwick Dam is located on the Tennessee River south of the Pickwick Landing Dam. Pickwick Dam has a post office with ZIP code 38365.

Pickwick Landing State Park is located in Pickwick Dam.

References

Unincorporated communities in Hardin County, Tennessee
Unincorporated communities in Tennessee
Tennessee populated places on the Tennessee River